Sodium-dependent phosphate transporter 1 is a protein that in humans is encoded by the SLC20A1 gene.

Retrovirus receptors allow infection of human and murine cells by various retroviruses. The receptors that have been identified at the molecular level include CD4 (MIM 186940) for human immunodeficiency virus, Rec1 for murine ecotropic virus, and GLVR1 for gibbon ape leukemia virus (see MIM 182090). These 3 proteins show no homology to one another at the DNA or protein level. GLVR1 is a sodium-dependent phosphate symporter.[supplied by OMIM]

Research

It was reported that mutations of the gene may cause epispadias or bladder exstrophy.

See also
 Solute carrier family

References

Further reading

Solute carrier family